The first season of the American animated television series Star Trek: Lower Decks follows the various missions and adventures of the "lower deckers" (low-ranking officers with menial jobs) on the USS Cerritos, one of Starfleet's least important starships. The season was produced by CBS Eye Animation Productions in association with Secret Hideout, Important Science, Roddenberry Entertainment, and animation studio Titmouse, with Mike McMahan serving as showrunner and Juno Lee as supervising director.

Tawny Newsome, Jack Quaid, Noël Wells, and Eugene Cordero voice the lower decks crew members of the Cerritos, with Dawnn Lewis, Jerry O'Connell, Fred Tatasciore, and Gillian Vigman providing voices for the ship's senior officers. Lower Decks was ordered in October 2018 with McMahan on board as showrunner. The series is a comedy, but the writers did not want to stray too far from the rest of the Star Trek franchise and used similar premises to classic Star Trek: The Next Generation stories for many episodes. Titmouse began work on the animation by February 2019, and the main cast was announced that July. Production, including voice recording, shifted to taking place remotely in March 2020 due to the COVID-19 pandemic. The season features many connections and references to past Star Trek series such as The Next Generation, including several actors returning as guest stars.

The season premiered on the streaming service CBS All Access on August 6, 2020, and ran for 10 episodes until October 10. It was met with mixed responses from critics for its humor, large number of Star Trek references, and lack of social commentary, but mostly positive reviews for the animation and Newsome's performance. The season received a Primetime Emmy Award nomination for its sound editing, as well as several other awards and nominations. A second season was ordered at the same time as the first in October 2018.

Episodes

Cast and characters

Main
 Tawny Newsome as Beckett Mariner
 Jack Quaid as Brad Boimler
 Noël Wells as D'Vana Tendi
 Eugene Cordero as Sam Rutherford
 Dawnn Lewis as Carol Freeman
 Jerry O'Connell as Jack Ransom
 Fred Tatasciore as Shaxs
 Gillian Vigman as T'Ana

Recurring

 Jessica McKenna as Barnes
 Ben Rodgers as Stevens
 Paul Scheer as Andy Billups
 Sam Richardson as Vendome
 Marcus Henderson as Jet Manhaver
 Tim Robinson as Fletcher
 Jack McBrayer as Badgey
 Lauren Lapkus as Jennifer

Notable guests

 J.G. Hertzler as Drookmani captain
 John de Lancie as Q
 Kurtwood Smith as Clar
 Kenneth Mitchell as Seartave
 Jonathan Frakes as William Riker
 Marina Sirtis as Deanna Troi

Production

Development
CBS All Access officially ordered two seasons of Star Trek: Lower Decks, a new animated series, in October 2018. Mike McMahan was set as showrunner for the series, and announced in July 2019 that the first season would consist of 10 episodes and be released in 2020. Executive producer Heather Kadin said in January 2020 that the season would be ready by May 2020, but would be scheduled for release around the other Star Trek series that were being produced for All Access. By late March, work on the season was taking place remotely due to the COVID-19 pandemic forcing staff to work from home. McMahan said that, at the time, delivery of the series had not been affected by the pandemic. It took around a day for everyone working on the series to be set-up to work from home. In July, CBS All Access officially scheduled the season to premiere in August 2020.

Writing

The series is set in 2380, one year after the film Star Trek: Nemesis (2002), and focuses on the support crew of the USS Cerritos rather than the main bridge crew that would usually be the focus of a Star Trek series. The writers began by discussing the main characters in the lower decks of the Cerritos, to determine what emotional stories and character arcs they wanted for each episode. They then came up with science fiction ideas that aligned with those arcs. McMahan felt the writers were attempting to "figur[e] out what the show was" for much of the season.

McMahan said the season was "playing the hits" of the series Star Trek: The Next Generation, adding: "Let's do our trial episode. Let's do our version of a movie. Let's do a plague on the ship. Let's do all these things that [feel familiar]". Though Lower Decks is a comedy, he did not want it to be about "punching down on Trek" and focused on telling Star Trek stories with characters who happen to be funny. The writers looked to previous Star Trek series to find similar characters and situations to what they were proposing for Lower Decks, to ensure that their comedic storylines were not straying too far from the franchise. The character Badgey began as a sketch of a Starfleet badge by McMahan that he felt could be similar to the hologram of Professor Moriarty from The Next Generation. The writers discussed what purpose Moriarty served in that series and how they could apply those ideas to Badgey in Lower Decks. Similarly, McMahan described the character of Ensign Fletcher as a dark version of Reginald Barclay from The Next Generation and Star Trek: Voyager since both characters fill the role of being a bad Starfleet officer.

Late in the season, McMahan felt they needed to explore the bridge crew more in order to tell better stories. This included Captain Freeman, who is revealed to be the mother of main character Beckett Mariner. McMahan based this relationship on that of his own mother and sister; his sister was the namesake for Mariner. They try to keep their relationship a secret but it becomes public knowledge in the season finale. McMahan described the penultimate episode, "Crisis Point", as a "classic Marvel Comics sort of story" with a lot of film tropes and homages to the Star Trek films. He also described it as being a parody of the Star Trek films, as well as a "big character therapy episode" that lets both the audience and Mariner see the relationship with her mother play out visually. The episode ends with an emotional breakthrough for Mariner that allows her to work with her mother in the season finale, setting up a new dynamic for the pair in the second season. McMahan said it was difficult to pitch the episode to executives, a problem that he also had with the episode "Veritas" which was inspired by his childhood memories of tuning into Star Trek episodes late and not understanding the context.

The season is filled with many references to other Star Trek series, which McMahan described as "texture and details that we love". There are also non-Star Trek Easter eggs, such as the registry number for the Cerritos being based on McMahan's mother's phone number. "Temporal Edict" ends with a statue of Miles O'Brien from The Next Generation and Star Trek: Deep Space Nine who McMahan said was the most important Star Trek character, explaining that O'Brien is "the original lower decker, moving from an enlisted crewman all the way to professor of engineering at Starfleet Academy... those of us who spent years watching him grow across two television series know he is, without a doubt, the most important person in Starfleet history". An element that McMahan enjoyed was being able to revisit aliens and locations from standalone episodes of previous Star Trek series, which was a way to bring back elements from earlier in the franchise without impacting on the existing Star Trek canon. This led to the writers featuring the Pakleds as the "big bads" in the season finale. The Pakleds were introduced in the Next Generation episode "Samaritan Snare" and "used to be sort of a joke", according to McMahan, but are shown in the finale of Lower Decks to have been secretly amassing power and are now a threat to Starfleet. McMahan saw this as a way to address the modern "re-rise of fascism" by having a group that "got too powerful, and now they are actually dangerous and people are paying with their lives for not taking them seriously".

Casting and voice recording

McMahan announced the series' main cast in July 2019, featuring ensigns serving in the "lower decks" of the Cerritos—Tawny Newsome as Beckett Mariner, Jack Quaid as Brad Boimler, Noël Wells as D'Vana Tendi, and Eugene Cordero as Sam Rutherford—and the ship's bridge crew who believe "the show is about them, but it's not"—Dawnn Lewis as Captain Carol Freeman, Jerry O'Connell as first officer Commander Jack Ransom, Fred Tatasciore as security chief Lieutenant Shaxs, and Gillian Vigman as chief medical officer Dr. T'Ana.

In August 2019, McMahan said there was potential for members of the Next Generation cast to make cameo appearances in the series since those characters are in the Star Trek universe at the time that Lower Decks is set, but he did not want this to be in a way that would "mess up the show". He wanted to include William Riker, and had previously met actor Jonathan Frakes while working in Toronto, Canada, on the shorts series Star Trek: Short Treks when Frakes was also there working on Star Trek: Discovery. Frakes was open to reprising his role in Lower Decks, and McMahan thought it would be natural to have Riker appear if the Cerritos needed help from the USS Titan, so that was written into the season finale. He also felt that they could not feature Riker without Deanna Troi also appearing. Marina Sirtis reprised her role as Troi from The Next Generation. McMahan described Riker in Lower Decks as an "enhanced" version of the character, and encouraged Frakes to let him be a "wild, insane character", which Frakes had wanted to do with Riker for years. John de Lancie also reprises his Next Generation role of Q. Additionally, several previous Star Trek actors play new characters, including Kurtwood Smith as Clar and Kenneth Mitchell as Seartave.

In June 2020, Newsome was asked by a fan on Twitter if comedian Paul F. Tompkins would have a guest role in the series given Newsome was a frequent guest on Tompkins' podcast Spontaneanation. Tompkins expressed interest in the idea, and McMahan responded to say that he was organizing to have Tompkins cast for a guest role in the series' second season; Tompkins ultimately voiced Dr. Migleemo, Mariner's therapist, in the first season. In July, Paul Scheer was revealed to have a recurring guest role as Chief Engineer Andy Billups. Other recurring characters in the season include Jessica McKenna as Ensign Barnes and the Cerritos computer, writer Ben Rodgers as Lieutenant Steve Stevens, Sam Richardson as Ensign Vendome, Marcus Henderson as Lieutenant Jet Manhaver, Tim Robinson as Ensign Fletcher, Jack McBrayer as Badgey, and Lauren Lapkus as Ensign Jennifer. The latter is an Andorian, which Newsome did not realize when she improvised the uncharacteristically human name "Jennifer" during recording.

Quaid and Newsome recorded their lines together with McMahan for most of the first season, until the pandemic forced all further recording, including additional dialogue recording (ADR), to take place remotely. This became one of the biggest challenges for the series during the pandemic because recording equipment was needed in each actor's house. Newsome already had a recording studio at her house that she used for the series.

Animation and design
Independent animation studio Titmouse provides the animation for the series, with Juno Lee serving as supervising director for the first season. Work on the series' animation began by the end of February 2019. The series' animation style reflects the look of "prime time animated comedy" series such as The Simpsons, but with more detailed backgrounds and environments than is traditional for prime time animation.

The uniforms worn by the crew of the Cerritos are based on unused designs for the film Star Trek Generations (1994), which McMahan said looked similar to designs from previous Star Trek series but were unique enough that fans would associate them with Lower Decks. The uniforms have a flap on the front, and come in yellow for engineering, blue for medical and science, and red for command. He suggested that these uniforms were just for California-class ships like the Cerritos; other Starfleet officers, such as the crew of the USS Titan, appear in the grey-shouldered uniforms from the Next Generation-era films and Deep Space Nine. Mariner also wears that uniform in a flashback to her time on the USS Quito. Regarding the use of multiple uniform styles at once, McMahan explained that not all starships get "the new stuff" at the same time. In the episode "Much Ado About Boimler"—which was inspired by the two-part Next Generation episode "Chain of Command"—Freeman, Ransom, and Shaxs wear the same stealth outfits that the characters in "Chain of Command" wear.

McMahan hoped that references to Star Trek: The Animated Series in Lower Decks would honor it as the franchise's first animated series, and make it "even more canon that it was before" (referencing a long-time fan debate regarding whether the series was officially part of the franchise's canon). When discussing the characters James T. Kirk and Spock from Star Trek: The Original Series (often abbreviated by fans as "TOS", which Lower Decks also jokingly uses in-universe to mean "Those Old Scientists"), an image of the pair from The Animated Series is shown instead of animating them with the style of Lower Decks. In addition to featuring alien species from all of the live-action Star Trek series, Lower Decks includes some "deep cut" species from The Animated Series: the cat-like Caitian Dr. T'Ana is the same species as the Animated Series character M'Ress; a Vendorian shapeshifter, first introduced in The Animated Series, appears in "Envoys"; and the three-armed Division 14 specialist in "Much Ado About Boimler" is an Edosian like the character Arex from The Animated Series. McMahan said these characters "fit in perfectly in [the Lower Decks] world" and the series did not have to justify the difference in appearance from the original version that a live-action adaptation of the species likely would.

The series' design team worked with John Van Citters, vice president for Star Trek brand management, and CBS Studios on the design of the USS Titan for the season finale. The ship had never been seen on screen before, but had appeared in video games and on book covers, and McMahan wanted to "make sure we got it right because there are fans out there for who the Titan is a favorite ship". McMahan was also very specific about the designs of the legacy characters Riker and Troi, down to Riker's height and Troi's larger-than-normal pupils. McMahan hoped that the appearance of the Titan and these characters would feel like "one day in a bigger story about those guys". The episode "Veritas" features many starships from throughout the franchise, with a sequence set at a starship museum that holds a 21st-century Vulcan ship like the one seen in Star Trek: First Contact (1996), a Klingon battlecruiser, a Jem'Hadar fighter, a Tholian ship, a Ferengi shuttle, and various Federation shuttles from The Original Series and The Next Generation. In the episode, the characters steal a Romulan Bird of Prey—a ship with cloaking technology that has appeared throughout the Star Trek franchise—from the museum, and they also use a long-range Vulcan shuttle that was introduced in Star Trek: The Motion Picture (1979).

Music
Composer Chris Westlake included several references to previous Star Trek music throughout the season, including an homage to fight music from The Original Series for a scene where Ransom fights an alien using the same distinctive fighting style as that series' protagonist, James T. Kirk. For "Crisis Point", Westlake wrote "movie-fied" versions of his Lower Decks theme, paying homage to the composers of the Star Trek films such as the nautical, French horn-based sound of James Horner from Star Trek II: The Wrath of Khan (1982). The episode also features a sequence where the crew slowly circles the Cerritos in a direct homage to a scene in Star Trek: The Motion Picture. Westlake referenced the music that Jerry Goldsmith wrote for the latter scene. In "Temporal Edict", Boimler is heard humming Goldsmith's main theme from The Motion Picture and The Next Generation.

The season's score was originally planned to be recorded with a 60-person orchestra in a traditional recording studio, but, due to the pandemic, each musician was recorded individually from home and then mixed together. The pandemic also caused the timeline for the series' release to be moved up to before that of Discovery third season, which meant Westlake had around two months less time to work on the score than he had expected. He described the timeline as becoming "super squeezed". Selections from Westlake's score for the season were included in the series' Vol. 1 soundtrack, which was released by Lakeshore Records on October 8, 2021.

Marketing

The series was promoted during the "Star Trek Universe" panel at the 2019 San Diego Comic-Con, where the main cast and first look images were revealed. Further details were discussed at a panel specifically for Lower Decks at Star Trek Las Vegas 2019. A trailer and poster were released in July 2020. Allie Gemmill of Collider called the trailer "a ton of fun and then some", comparing its adult-oriented tone to the series Rick and Morty which McMahan previously worked on. This was followed by a "Star Trek Universe" panel at the 2020 Comic-Con@Home virtual convention where McMahan and the cast discussed the series and revealed its opening scene. At the end of July, All Access released a new trailer celebrating "23 weeks of New Trek" and featuring footage from both the first season of Lower Decks and the third season of Discovery; the 23 weeks include both series, with Lower Decks premiering on August 6 and running for 10 weeks, followed the next week by the premiere of Discovery which then ran for 13 weeks. Animation studio Titmouse released a shirt with a unique design on it alongside each episode of Lower Decks. The designs were only available for one week each. Fans who bought all ten designs received a bonus eleventh shirt.

Release

Streaming and broadcast
The season premiered on August 6, 2020, on CBS All Access in the United States, and ran for 10 episodes until October 8. Like previous All Access Star Trek series, each episode of the season was broadcast in Canada by Bell Media on the same day as the All Access release, on the specialty channels CTV Sci-Fi Channel (English) and Z (French) before streaming on Crave.

International distribution for the series had not been secured by the time of its premiere in the U.S. and Canada. The series was originally intended for release later in 2020, following the release of the third season of Star Trek: Discovery, but the premiere date for Lower Decks was moved up after the COVID-19 pandemic impacted the post-production timeline for Discovery and forced that series to be delayed. McMahan explained that negotiations for international distribution could not be similarly moved up, so the release of the series outside of the U.S. and Canada would have to wait until those negotiations were completed. Amazon Prime Video was revealed, in December 2020, to have picked up the streaming rights for the series in several territories—including Europe, Australia, New Zealand, Japan, and India—with the full first season released on the service on January 22, 2021.

In September 2020, ViacomCBS announced that CBS All Access would be expanded and rebranded as Paramount+ in March 2021. The season remained on Paramount+ along with future seasons. In February 2023, Paramount made a new deal with Prime Video for the series' international streaming rights. This allowed the season to be added to Paramount+ in some other countries in addition to remaining on Prime Video.

Home media
The season was released on DVD, Blu-Ray, and limited edition steelbook formats in the U.S. on May 18, 2021. The release includes almost two hours of bonus features, including deleted and extended animatics, featurettes on the cast and characters, the references to other Star Trek series, and the making of each episode, and an "over-the-top action trailer" for the fictional film Crisis Point from the episode of the same name.

Reception

Critical response
Rotten Tomatoes reported 68% approval with an average rating of 7.20/10 based on 47 reviews. The website's critical consensus reads, "Fun, but not very bold, Lower Decks flips the script on Star Trek regulation just enough to stand out in the franchise, if not the greater animation landscape." Metacritic, which uses a weighted average, assigned a score of 59 out of 100 based on reviews from 17 critics, indicating "mixed or average reviews".

Robert Lloyd at the Los Angeles Times praised the series for being "a Star Trek series at heart, not a spoof", and favorably compared it to the series Futurama. IndieWire Christian Blauvelt agreed, saying it "might be the most Trek series ever" and on par with other "comedic riffs on Trek" such as Galaxy Quest (1999) and The Orville. David Bianculli at NPR felt the series was "not as delightful" as Galaxy Quest, but better than The Orville since animation allowed it to be "looser with its ideas and its humor". Jamie Lovett at ComicBook.com attributed the franchise's successful transition to animated comedy to McMahan's love for Star Trek, something that Matt Roush at TV Insider, Liz Shannon Miller at Collider, and James Whitbrook at Gizmodo also highlighted. TV Guide Keith Phipps and SFX Magazine Richard Edwards both said the series balanced respect for Star Trek with the needs of comedy, though Edwards thought it was not as funny as Rick and Morty or McMahan's Solar Opposites, while Josh Bell at Comic Book Resources felt the series was not always successful in keeping that balance but was still a "pleasant diversion" that Star Trek fans should enjoy. Josh Jackson of Paste and Joshua Rivera of The Verge also said Star Trek fans would enjoy the series, despite Jackson saying it was not as funny as Rick and Morty and Rivera feeling the latter made the whole concept of a Star Trek comedy series feel "stale". Writing for /Film, Ben Pearson said the series was "surprisingly friendly to newbies", though CNN Brian Lowry said it was unlikely to attract new subscribers to CBS All Access. He felt it would amuse the committed Star Trek fans who had already subscribed. Alex Maidy at JoBlo was pleased the series did not "destroy the legacy of Star Trek", and Josh Tyler at Giant Freakin Robot called it "more like Star Trek than anything the franchise has produced since Voyager" which he attributed to McMahan being a "real Trekkie". A. J. Black, reviewing the season for Cultural Conversation, called it "exactly the series most Star Trek fans have wished for since 2005" which made the franchise "not just funny, but fun again. It has been a long time since any fan felt that".

Daniel D'Addario of Variety said branching out to an animated comedy series was "admirable" for the Star Trek franchise, but stated, "if the joke of Lower Decks is that its characters... fall short of demanding a show about their adventures, it's not hard to agree". Noah Gittell of The Guardian also felt the series would be a promising departure for a franchise entry if it had more ambition. He criticized the fast pacing, as did Keith R. A. DeCandido at Tor.com who was also critical of the large number of Star Trek references. Polygon Samantha Nelson also criticized the references while saying the series had "the broad character archetypes and opportunity for Futurama creative mission-based hijinks, [without] any of its biting commentary on capitalism or politics." Rob Owen at the Pittsburgh Post-Gazette felt the series was "not often funny" and substituted chaos for comedy, Zack Handlen at The A.V. Club said it was "less 'funny' than it is 'the idea of funny'" with a reliance on fan-service, and Daniel Fienberg at The Hollywood Reporter said it "places references where gags ought to be and assumes that you'll find it uproarious". Norman Wilner at NOW criticized the number and speed of jokes with little time for them to register or for the characters to just talk, while Alan Sepinwall at Rolling Stone said the number of references were preventing McMahan from making the "wildyl irreverent—and, more importantly, actually funny—comedy" series that he wanted to. Sepinwall also suggested that a Rick and Morty-style series could not work without that series' creator, Dan Harmon. Tara Ariano at Primetimer said the series was "a little too reverential toward the [Star Trek] franchise" and felt tame compared to the concurrent adult animated series Harley Quinn, and Mike Hale of The New York Times described it as "half Star Trek fan service and half smutty workplace sitcom... it doesn't register very strongly as either [which] is another way of saying it's not all that funny". Stuff James Croot called the series a "lowering of the bar" for the franchise and "crassly crude", suggesting audiences watch The Orville or Galaxy Quest instead. Writing for RogerEbert.com, Roxana Hadadi called the series "amusing but slight", struggling to develop its own identity and coming across more like "adoring fan fiction". Brian Tallerico at The Playlist felt the series had the franchise's setting but did not live up to its previous stories, and DeCandido added that it "can't seem to make up its mind whether it's a comedy in the Star Trek universe, a parody of Star Trek, or a 21st-century office comedy awkwardly transplanted onto a 24th-century Starfleet vessel."

Reviewers often noted the animation's similarity to Rick and Morty. Lloyd said the animation was "not especially elegant", and Fienberg described it as "bland-but-amiable", while Tyler felt it was "fairly low-rent [and] easy" but praised the results, especially the starships and backdrops. Angelica Jade Bastién at Vulture said the animation was not visually unique, but still found it to be "bright and eye-catching", and Blauvelt said it was "purposefully cartoony—but never less than engaging". Multiple critics praised the use of animation to create locations, aliens, and scenarios that would be difficult or impossible in the live-action Star Trek series, including Sepinwall, Miller, and Glen Weldon of NPR who all referred to Lower Decks "unlimited special effects budget". Multiple critics also highlighted the homages to The Next Generation in the series' title sequence, especially the title font and music. Discussing the cast, Lovett said Newsome, Quaid, Wells, and Cordero all had "infectious energy and zealous performances". Newsome received especial praise from Roush, Bastién, Rivera, Whitbrook, and Miller. Tyler, conversely, said Mariner was annoying and "there to create 'comedy' by shouting a lot and being rude to everyone". DeCandido concurred with this, calling her "completely unlikeable... a mean horrible person". He was also critical of the lack of screen time for Tendi and Rutherford compared to Mariner and Boimler, a sentiment that was echoed by Whitbrook and Hadadi.

Reviewing just the first four episodes of the season, Bastién felt it had potential to become "more dynamic and narratively sound in the future" if it embraced earnestness. Hadadi felt it needed a "clearer course forward" if it was to find its footing in future episodes, and Phipps said it still needed to develop the "emotional bonds between characters found in the best Star Trek series". Handlen noted that Star Trek series are well known for taking time to come into their own, and felt this could happen with Lower Decks too; he was more positive about the series after the first season ended, stating that it "quickly found its focus" after a "clumsy start". Tara Bennett of IGN also felt there were issues with the series to begin with, specifically the "hyper-fast delivery [of jokes] and overly busy episodes", but said the series had "mellow[ed] out" by the end of the season and added a lot more depth to the characters and stories. In contrast, Blauvelt and Black both felt the series was the exception to the Star Trek rule and had found its footing straight away. Discussing the season as a whole, Drew Dietsch at Giant Freakin Robot called it "the best Star Trek series in recent memory" and specifically praised the "outright goofiness and wide-eyed optimism" of the characters as well as the series' episodic structure.

Accolades
The season is one of 117 television series that received the ReFrame Stamp for the years 2020 to 2021. The stamp is awarded by the gender equity coalition ReFrame as a "mark of distinction" for film and television projects that are proven to have gender-balanced hiring, with stamps being awarded to projects that hire female-identifying people, especially women of color, in four out of eight critical areas of their production.

References

External links 
 
 

1
2020 American television seasons